Lorediplon (INN) is a nonbenzodiazepine of the pyrazolopyrimidine family that is being pursued as a treatment for insomnia but has not completed development.

See also
 List of investigational sleep drugs

References

Acetamides
Pyrazoles
Pyrimidines
Thiophenes
GABAA receptor positive allosteric modulators